Sara Ortega Ruiz (born 20 February 2005) is a Spanish footballer who plays as a forward for Athletic Club.

Club career
Ortega started her career at Comillas' academy. Ortega made her senior debut in the Copa de la Reina against Racing in January 2022 at only 16 years old, scoring a goal after coming on as a substitute. She became the first woman to debut for Athletic Club at 16 years of age since Leyre Monente in 2016. In February, she then debuted in the Primera División against Eibar.

International career
In January 2020, Ortega received a call up to join the Spain under-16 team for training. Ortega made her debut for the Spain under-17 squad in September 2021 against Iceland.

References

External links
 
 
 
 

2005 births
Living people
Spanish women's footballers
Women's association football forwards
Sportspeople from Logroño
Footballers from La Rioja (Spain)
Athletic Club Femenino B players
Athletic Club Femenino players
Segunda Federación (women) players
Primera División (women) players
Spain women's youth international footballers